Edward Studd can refer to:

 Edward Studd (cricketer, born 1849) (1849-1909), English cricketer
 Edward Studd (cricketer, born 1878) (1878-1851), English cricketer